Hugues Lapointe  (March 3, 1911 – November 13, 1982) was a Canadian lawyer, Member of Parliament and Lieutenant Governor of Quebec from 1966 to 1978.

Life and career 
Born in Rivière-du-Loup, Quebec, the son of the Canadian Member of Parliament Ernest Lapointe and Emma Pratte, he studied at the University of Ottawa and Université Laval. He was admitted to the Quebec Bar in 1935. He practised law from 1936 to 1961. He served during World War II and achieved the rank of lieutenant colonel.

He was elected as a Liberal in the 1940 federal election in the Quebec riding of Lotbinière. He was re-elected in the 1945, 1949, and 1953 elections. He was defeated in the 1957 election.

He held three cabinet positions: Solicitor General of Canada (1949–1950), Minister of Veterans Affairs (1950–1957), and Postmaster General (1955–1957).

In 1979, he was made an Officer of the Order of Canada.

He was married to Marie-Lucette Valin.

References
 Hugues Lapointe at Assemblée nationale du Québec 
 Hugues Lapointe fonds, Library and Archives Canada

External links
Order of Canada Citation

1911 births
1982 deaths
Lawyers in Quebec
Canadian King's Counsel
Liberal Party of Canada MPs
Members of the House of Commons of Canada from Quebec
Lieutenant Governors of Quebec
Officers of the Order of Canada
Members of the King's Privy Council for Canada
People from Rivière-du-Loup
20th-century Canadian lawyers
Solicitors General of Canada